"Feelin' Satisfied" is a song by American rock band Boston, released as a single in 1979, and written by Tom Scholz from their 1978 album Don't Look Back. "Feelin' Satisfied" was released as a single and went up to #46 on the Billboard Hot 100.  It only reached #84 in Canada.  It was the band's last single release for 7 years, until "Amanda" in 1986.

Reception
Paul Grein of Billboard described the song as "an affectionate tribute to the power of music."  The same magazine later described the song as an "upbeat track which is totally rock 'n' roll," praising the "clear singing" and "fresh sounds."  Cash Box said it has "those Boston characteristics that has made the group a platinum act: tight-skin percussion, majestic guitar lines and do-the-job soaring vocals."  Cash Box also called it a "fine track." Record World called it "one of [Don't Look Backs] most powerful rockers" and praised the guitar playing, Brad Delp's lead vocal and the "multi -track vocal hook."  

Terry Hazlett of The Observer-Reporter described the song as an "innocent little [ditty]" which comes across like a "rock 'n' roll anthem."  Pete Bishop of The Pittsburgh Press claimed that it has "an infectious happy feel."  But Press & Sun-Bulletin critic Chris Carson described "Feelin' Satisfied" as being "on par with the filler" on Boston's debut album.

Legacy
AXS contributor Bill Craig described the lyrics as being about "the wonders of rock music."  Ultimate Classic Rock critic Michael Gallucci described it as a "simple" song that, in common with many Boston songs, "celebrates rock 'n' roll."  Gallucci rated it Boston's 8th greatest song, particularly praising the effect from the hand claps during the refrain.  Paul Elliott rated it their 7th greatest song, commenting on its "sense of fun" as Scholz lets go of some of his usual control.  Elliott described it as a "grooving hard rocker."  Classic Rock History critic Brian Kachejian rated it as Boston's 8th best song.

Charts

References

1978 songs
1979 singles
Boston (band) songs
Songs written by Tom Scholz
Song recordings produced by Tom Scholz
Epic Records singles